Vincent Noel Serventy AM (6 January 1916 – 8 September 2007) was an Australian author, ornithologist and conservationist.

Life and career
Born in Armadale, Western Australia, the youngest of eight children of migrant Croatian parents, Vincent Serventy graduated from the University of Western Australia in geology and psychology. He was a CSIRO researcher and teacher before beginning a career as a writer, lecturer and film-maker. He joined the Royal Australasian Ornithologists Union (RAOU) in 1942 and served as either its Branch Secretary or State Representative for Western Australia 1943–1959. In 1946 he became a life member of the Wildlife Preservation Society of Australia and was for many years its president.

In 1956 he bought a movie camera and began making documentary films which later led to Australia's first television environment program, Nature Walkabout (1967).

In 1974 he was awarded the Australian Natural History Medallion. In 1976 he was appointed a Member of the Order of Australia.

In 1985 Vincent Serventy assisted the Conservation Council of Western Australia in its unsuccessful campaign to stop a major road being built through the Trigg Regional Open Space.  This public land had been identified by the System 6 Study Report to the Environmental Protection Authority as having important conservation value with the bushland extending from the sea to tuart and banksia woodland, a rarity in the metropolitan area. Vincent spoke publicly of the importance of this land for its vegetation, landforms and habitat for local fauna and migratory birds.

Vincent Serventy was a younger brother of the Australian ornithologist Dom Serventy.

Serventy wrote numerous articles on natural history and conservation.  Some of his books are:
 The Archipelago of the Recherche. Part 2: Birds (AGS Report No.1. Australian Geographical Society: Melbourne, 1952)
 The Australian Nature Trail (Georgian House: Melbourne, 1965)
 A Continent in Danger (Survival Books. A Survival Special. Andre Deutsch: London, 1966)
 Nature Walkabout (Reed: Artarmon, 1969)
 Southern Walkabout (Reed: Artarmon, 1969)
 Around the Bush with Vincent Serventy (ABC: Sydney, 1970)
 Dryandra. The story of an Australian forest (Reed: Sydney, 1970)
 The Handbook of Australian Sea-birds (Reed: Sydney, 1971) (with Dominic Serventy and John Warham)
 Australia’s World Heritage Sites (1985)
 The Desert Sea. The Miracle of Lake Eyre in Flood (Macmillan Australia: Melbourne, 1985)
 Flight of the Shearwater (Kangaroo Press: Kenthurst, 1996)
 An Australian Life. Memoirs of a naturalist, conservationist, traveller and writer (Fremantle Arts Centre Press: South Fremantle, 1999)

Notes

References
 Robin, Libby. (2001). The Flight of the Emu: a hundred years of Australian ornithology 1901-2001. Carlton, Vic. Melbourne University Press. 
 Serventy, Vincent N. (1999). An Australian Life. Memoirs of a naturalist, conservationist, traveller and writer. Fremantle Arts Centre Press: South Fremantle. 
 Stephens, Tony (2007). "Green before it was fashionable: Vincent Serventy, 1916-2007" in The Sydney Morning Herald, 2007-09-12, p. 20

External links
http://www.wpsa.org.au/pdf/news/VincentServenty.pdf

1916 births
2007 deaths
Australian ornithologists
Members of the Order of Australia
Australian memoirists
Australian nature writers
Australian travel writers
Australian documentary filmmakers
Australian people of Croatian descent
People educated at Perth Modern School
University of Western Australia alumni
Writers from Western Australia
Scientists from Western Australia
20th-century memoirists
20th-century Australian zoologists